The Bihar cricket team represents the state of Bihar in Indian domestic cricket competitions. It is run by Bihar Cricket Association.

History

1936 to 2004
The team competed in the Ranji Trophy from 1936-37 until 2003–04. When the state of Bihar was divided into two states, Bihar and Jharkhand, most of the former state's cricket infrastructure was in Jharkhand, so Jharkhand commenced playing in the Ranji Trophy, and the  state of Bihar was no longer represented. Before this partition Bihar played 236 first-class matches, winning 78, losing 56 and drawing 102.

Bihar's best performance in Ranji Trophy was in 1975-76 Ranji Trophy season, when Daljit Singh led Bihar to Ranji Trophy finals.

2018 onwards
In April 2018, the Board of Control for Cricket in India (BCCI) reinstated Bihar, ahead of the 2018–19 Ranji Trophy tournament. On 19 September 2018, they won their opening fixture of the 2018–19 Vijay Hazare Trophy, beating Nagaland by 8 wickets.

On 8 October 2018, Bihar defeated Mizoram by 9 wickets to enter the Quarter-finals of 2018-19 Vijay Hazare Trophy. Bihar won the Plate Group and progressed to the knock-out phase of the tournament. However, they were beaten by nine wickets by Mumbai in their quarter-final match to be knocked out of the tournament.

In November 2018, in their opening match of the 2018–19 Ranji Trophy, they lost to Uttarakhand by ten wickets. They finished the 2018–19 tournament second in the table, with six wins from their eight matches.

In March 2019, Bihar finished sixth in Group B of the 2018–19 Syed Mushtaq Ali Trophy, with one win from their six matches. Keshav Kumar was the leading run-scorer for the team in the tournament, with 145 runs, and Ashutosh Aman was the leading wicket-taker, with seven dismissals.

On 29 January 2023, Bihar defeated Manipur by 220 runs to win the Plate Group Final of 2022-23 Ranji Trophy.

Honours
 Ranji Trophy
 Runners-up: 1975–76

Cricket grounds

Current squad

Updated as on 25 January 2023

Support staff
Team Manager: Ajay Tiwari
Head Coach: Pawan Kumar
Assistant Coach: Sanjay Kumar 
Team Physio: Dr. Abhishek
Team Trainer: Akhilesh Shukla

Famous players

Abhijeet Saket
Bimal Bose
Daljit Singh
M.S. Dhoni
Neeraj Kumar
Pawan Kumar
Rajiv Kumar
Ramesh Saxena
Randhir Singh
Shute Banerjee
Sujit Mukherjee
Syed Saba Karim
Tariq-ur-Rehman
Tarun Kumar
V. Venkatram
Zeeshan Ali
Ishan Kishan

See also
Bihar Women's cricket team
Bihar Cricket Association
Jharkhand cricket team
Bihar cricket team in Ranji Trophy
Bihar Cricket team in Vijay Hazare Trophy

References

External links
Lists of matches played by Bihar

Bihar
Cricket in Bihar
1936 establishments in India
Cricket clubs established in 1936